Beverly Andrew Davis (September 27, 1868 – May 31, 1944) was an American lawyer and Republican politician who served as a member of the Virginia Senate from 1916 to 1920.

In 1902, he ran for Congress against Claude A. Swanson in Virginia's 5th district but lost 60.80 to 37.63%.

References

External links
 
 

1868 births
1944 deaths
Republican Party Virginia state senators
20th-century American politicians
People from Franklin County, Virginia